Sydney Rundle Walford (15 November 1859 – 2 July 1949) was an Australian cricketer.

A right-handed batsman, he played 13 first-class cricket matches for New South Wales scoring 351 runs. He played all but one of his first-class matches during the two tours of New Zealand that New South Wales made in 1893-94 and 1895-96. He scored his only first-class century, 122, to help New South Wales to victory over Canterbury on their tour in 1895-96.

He and his wife Hannah, who predeceased him, had three sons and a daughter.

See also
 List of New South Wales representative cricketers

References

External links
 

1859 births
1949 deaths
Australian cricketers
New South Wales cricketers
Sportsmen from New South Wales